Dramatico is a record label founded by Mike Batt in 2000. Artists on the label include Mike Batt, Robert Meadmore, Sarah Blasko, Katie Melua, Leddra Chapman and Alistair Griffin. Dramatico has also established a publishing company  in New York City and Germany. Artists signed to Dramatico Publishing include Reyna Larson, FL Jones, and The Paper Scissors.

See also
 List of record labels

References

British record labels
Pop record labels